Cavemen is a 2013 American comedy film about a young man in Los Angeles who feels the emptiness of a life of dissipation and seeks a genuine relationship, which he discovers is more difficult to do than he thought.

Cavemen made its world premiere at the 2013 Austin Film Festival where the screenplay had been a competition finalist several years earlier. On review aggregation website Rotten Tomatoes, the film holds an approval rating of 14% based on 14 reviews, with an average rating of 3.32/10.

Cast 
 Skylar Astin  as	Dean
 Camilla Belle  as	Tess
 Chad Michael Murray  as   Jay
 Dayo Okeniyi  as   Andre
 Alexis Knapp  as   Kat
 Kenny Wormald  as   Pete
 Jason Patric as Jack Bartlett
 Fernanda Romero as Rosa
 Zuleyka Silver  as Alicia
 Anand Desai-Barochia	as  Giuseppe

References

External links
 

2013 films
American comedy films
2013 comedy films
2010s English-language films
2010s American films